Rudolph James Wig (October 3, 1883April 8, 1968) was an American industrialist, trustee of Pomona College, and layman of the Presbyterian Church.

References

American industrialists
Pomona College trustees
1883 births
1968 deaths
American Presbyterians
20th-century American academics